Kniahynivka is an urban-type settlement in the Rovenky Raion of the Luhansk Oblast of Ukraine. Population:

References

Urban-type settlements in Rovenky Raion